Bertram Fitzalan (died 1424) was an English Carmelite theologian.

Life
Fitzalan entered the Carmelite fraternity at Lincoln, and studied at Oxford, where William Quaplod, also a Carmelite, was his friend and patron. He was at the trial in 1392 of Henry Crump, and was by then B.D.

Fitzalan, after proceeding to the degree of master, seems to have returned to Lincoln. He died on 17 May 1424.

Works
He founded a library in Lincoln. In it John Bale saw the following works of his:

'Super quarto Sententiarum liber i.,'
'Quæstiones Theologiæ,' and
'Ad plebem Conciones.'

A volume of Excerpta in the library of Balliol College, Oxford once attributed to Fitzalan is now thought to be by Bertrand de Alen.

References

Attribution

Year of birth missing
1424 deaths
Carmelites
English theologians
15th-century English people
Alumni of the University of Oxford